Mouhamed Ali Ndiaye (born 26 October 1979) is an Italian professional boxer. He is a former European Union super-middleweight champion and has challenged twice for the European super-middleweight title.

Professional career
Born in Senegal but based in Italy throughout his career, Ndiaye made his professional debut on 1 October 2005, scoring a fourth-round knockout against Thomas Dodoo. From 2006 to 2007, Ndiaye won three regional IBF super-middleweight titles. His first opportunity at fighting for a major regional championship—the European Union super-middleweight title—was on 14 March 2008, which ended in a split decision loss to Lolenga Mock.

On 11 November 2011, Ndiaye scored a late twelfth-round stoppage against Andrea Di Luisa to win the now-vacant European Union super-middleweight title on his second attempt. One defence of this title was made in a ninth-round corner stoppage over Jose Maria Guerrero on 26 May 2012. Ndiaye fought to a controversial split draw with Christopher Rebrassé on 8 June 2013, with the vacant European super-middleweight title on the line. In their EBU-mandated rematch on 22 March 2014, Rebrassé won the aforementioned title by stopping Ndiaye in four rounds.

Professional boxing record

References

External links

Super-middleweight boxers
Living people
1979 births
Italian male boxers
Senegalese emigrants to Italy
Italian sportspeople of African descent